Ladd is an unincorporated community in northwestern Texas County, in the U.S. state of Missouri.

The community was located in Long Hollow, approximately 1.25 miles south of the Texas-Pulaski county line and about 1.75 miles northeast of Evening Shade. The Long Hollow church and cemetery are located about one-half mile south in Long Hollow and the historic Long Hollow school was located near the community site.

History
A post office called Ladd was established in 1892, and remained in operation until 1922. The community has the name of Ladd Davis, the son of an early settler.

References

Unincorporated communities in Texas County, Missouri
Unincorporated communities in Missouri